Carl Max Schultheiss (1885 in Nuremberg – 1961 in New York City) was a German graphic designer, active since 1940 in the United States.

Carl Max Schultheiss studied at the former Royal School of Applied Arts in Nuremberg and at the Munich Academy under Wilhelm von Diez.

Schultheiss married Alice Trier in 1914. He worked mainly as an engraver and book graphic designer, was also involved in the fresco painting.

Schultheiss emigrated in May 1939 to the United Kingdom. He came in March 1940 to the United States, where he continued his activities. 1951 he began to experiment with printing in color.

Carl Max Schultheiss was elected a member of the National Academy of Design in New York, was awarded with the John Taylor Arms Prize at the 29th Annual Exhibition of the Society of American Etchers. He exhibited his works in the Carnegie Museums of Pittsburgh, Art Institute of Chicago, and in the Library of Congress. In 1946 a solo exhibition of his works took place in the Corcoran Gallery of Art in Washington, DC.

References

External links 
National Academy Museum
Bing Images

German engravers
American engravers
Artists from Nuremberg
Emigrants from Nazi Germany to the United States
1885 births
1961 deaths